The 2014–15 BeNe League was the third and last season of the Belgium and Netherlands' women's football top level league. The defending champion was FC Twente. The season started on 29 August 2014 and was played in a single division. The season finished on 8 May 2015.

Following this season, Belgium and the Netherlands will have their own top level league again. The BeNe League initiative was ended because Dutch clubs and the Dutch FA failed to come to an agreement regarding the clubs' financial participation for the following seasons. The Dutch FA also questioned the lack of competitiveness.

After the season, the Netherlands revived the Eredivisie as top league and Belgium created a new Super League.

Format
The seven Dutch and six Belgian teams play a double round-robin where each team plays against each other two times (once at home and once away).

Teams
The league was played by seven Dutch and six Belgian teams.

Royal Antwerp left the BeNe League for financial reasons after previous season. Otherwise the same teams as last year compete. Club Brugge shut down their first team after the season, to focus on youth teams.

Standings
All teams play in a single group this season. The best placed Belgium and Dutch team qualify for the Champions League.

League table

Results

Top goalscorers
Updated to games played on 8 May 2015.

References

External links

Season at soccerway.com

BeNe League
BeNe League
1
BeNe League